The 2015–16 Vermont Catamounts men's basketball team represented the University of Vermont during the 2015–16 NCAA Division I men's basketball season. The Catamounts, led by fifth year head coach John Becker, played their home games at Patrick Gym and were members of the America East Conference. They finished the season 23–14, 11–5 in America East play to finish in a tie for third place. They Maine and New Hampshire to advance to the championship game of the America East tournament where they lost to Stony Brook. They were invited to the College Basketball Invitational where they defeated Western Carolina and Seattle to advance to the semifinals where they lost to Nevada.

Roster

Schedule

|-
!colspan=9 style="background:#008000; color:#FFD700;"| Exhibition

|-
!colspan=9 style="background:#008000; color:#FFD700;"| Non-conference regular season

|-
!colspan=9 style="background:#008000; color:#FFD700;"| American East regular season

|-
!colspan=9 style="background:#008000; color:#FFD700;"| America East tournament

|-
!colspan=9 style="background:#008000; color:#FFD700;"| CBI

References

Vermont Catamounts men's basketball seasons
Vermont
Vermont Catamounts men's b
Vermont Catamounts men's b
Vermont